Nizar Baraka (born 6 February 1964) is a Moroccan politician and businessman of the Istiqlal Party. He is the grandson of nationalist Allal Al Fassi. 

He was Minister of Economy and Finance in the government of Abdelilah Benkirane.
Baraka holds a PhD in econometrics from Aix-Marseille University in France. 
He taught at the University of Rabat and the National Institute of Statistics and Applied Economics, then he joined the Ministry of Finance in 1996 where he held a variety of positions, including that of Deputy Director of the Department of Studies and Financial Forecasts.
In 2007, Baraka was appointed Minister Delegate to the Prime Minister for Economic and General Affairs (2007-2012) then Minister of Economy and Finance (2012-2013). He was named Finance Minister of the Year 2013 for Middle East and North Africa by “Emerging Markets” (The World Bank and the International Monetary Fund) and Best Finance Minister for the MENA region for 2012 and Minister of Finance of the year 2012 by The Banker, (the Financial Times press group).

In April 2013,Hamid Chabat Secretary-General of the Istiqlal Party announced his intentions to leave the coalition that forms the cabinet of Abdelilah Benkirane. Consequently, a resignation request was submitted on 9 July 2013 for all the Party's ministers.
On 21 August 2013 he was appointed to head the CESE. 
He was also the President of the Scientific Committee of Cop22, Chair of the Economic Working Group of the U.S.-Morocco Strategic Dialogue and member of the Averroès Committee, charged with strengthening cooperation between Morocco and Spain

On October 7th 2017, Baraka was elected Secretary-General of the Istiqlal party, by 924 votes against 230 votes for his rival and outgoing secretary-general Hamid Chabat.

References

External links
Ministry of Economy and Finance

Living people
Finance ministers of Morocco
Government ministers of Morocco
People from Rabat
1964 births
Istiqlal Party politicians